Kern or KERN may refer to:

Places 
 Kern, Alaska, a ghost town in Alaska
 Kern, Austria, see Sankt Marienkirchen am Hausruck
 Kern, California, a former unincorporated community in Kern County, California
 Kern County, California, a county in the southern Central Valley of the U.S. state of California
 Kern River, California, a river which drains an area of the southern Sierra Nevada mountains
 Kern, Missouri, an unincorporated community
 Boron, California or Kern, California, a census-designated place (CDP) in Kern County, California, United States

Other uses 
 Kern (surname), a surname
 Kern (typography), the process of adjusting the spacing between characters in a proportional font
 Kern (soldier), a light infantry unit in Medieval Irish armies
 Kern AG, a German-based international language service company
 KERN, an American radio station
 Cell (music), melodic kernels, called Kern in German music theory

See also 

 
 Cern (disambiguation)
 Kerne (disambiguation)
 Kernel (disambiguation)
 Kerner (disambiguation)
 Kerns (disambiguation)
 Kirn (disambiguation)
 Saoud Qern (born 1987) Saudi soccer player